Cuartel de Santa Lucia is a ruined building in Intramuros, Manila, the Philippines.

It was constructed for the Artillería de Montaña in 1781 following the plans of Tomas Sanz. Its construction was executed during the governorship of José Basco y Vargas. In 1901, the Philippine Constabulary used the buildings as its headquarters. In 1905, it was opened as a military school, or the Philippine Military Academy in Baguio at present. The building turned into ruins during World War II, thus, the remaining walls were reconstructed by the Philippine Constabulary. The interior was never rebuilt and is being converted into a park.

Existing structures within the vicinity

The barracks were located near the Santa Lucia Gate and beside the Beaterio de la Compañía.

Santa Lucia Gate
The Santa Lucia Gate, or Puerta de Santa Lucia, was built at the end of Calle Real del Parian. It also served as the principal egress going to the seashore. It was built by Governor General Jose Basco y Vargas from 1778 up to 1787 during the reign of King Carlos III. The planning for the construction of the gate started in 1781, and was completed circa 1791, drawn by Brambila. Santa Lucia Gate was demolished by American tanks in 1945 and was rebuilt in 1968 by the Intramuros Restoration Committee, in accordance to the original plans archived from Spain.

Beaterio de la Compañia
Founded by Ignacia del Espíritu Santo, a mestiza Chinese from Binondo, the beaterio housed the beatas, lay sisters dedicated to prayer and charitable work. By the 19th century, the Beatas had a residence along Calle Santa Lucia. The Beaterio was simple structure of mortar. Its main entrance was through an arched portal, which led to a large hall; the wings to the left for the residences. The windows were composed of simple rectangles. The Beatas de la Compañia which was housed in this building is a Rome recognized religious congregation in 1948.

The beaterio's site is now occupied by Intramuros' Light and Sound Museum.

Present condition
Cuartel de Santa Lucia has been in ruins since World War II.

Marker from the National Historical Commission of the Philippines
The marker of Cuartel de Santa Lucia was installed on August 4, 1990 at Intramuros, Manila. It was installed by the National Historical Institute.

References

Buildings and structures in Intramuros
Tourist attractions in Manila
Forts in the Philippines
Spanish Colonial Fortifications of the Philippines
Cultural Properties of the Philippines in Metro Manila
Marked Historical Structures of the Philippines